Jordan Cole Westburg (born February 18, 1999) is an American professional baseball shortstop in the Baltimore Orioles organization.

Amateur career
Westburg attended New Braunfels High School in New Braunfels, Texas, where he played baseball, basketball, and football. He committed to play college baseball at Mississippi State University after his junior year. As a senior in 2017, he batted .457 with four home runs and 22 RBIs, earning All-State honors. Undrafted in the 2017 Major League Baseball draft, he enrolled at Mississippi State.

In 2018, Westburg's freshman year with the Mississippi State Bulldogs, he appeared in 42 games (making 31 starts) in which he batted .248 with two home runs and thirty RBIs. He missed over two weeks due to a hamstring injury. As a sophomore in 2019, Westburg started 66 games, hitting .300 with six home runs and 61 RBIs. He earned Southeastern Conference Player of the Week in March, batting .476 with two home runs and 11 RBIs over five games. That summer, he played in the Cape Cod Baseball League for the Hyannis Harbor Hawks alongside being named to the USA Baseball Collegiate National Team. In 2020, his junior season, he batted .317 with two home runs and 11 RBIs over 16 games before the college baseball season was cut short due to the COVID-19 pandemic.

Professional career
The Baltimore Orioles selected Westburg with the 30th overall pick in the 2020 Major League Baseball draft. Westburg signed with the Orioles on June 28, 2020 for a $2.3 million bonus. He did not play a minor league game in 2020 due to the cancellation of the minor league season caused by the pandemic.

Westburg made his professional debut in 2021 with the Delmarva Shorebirds of the Low-A East. On June 1, he was promoted to the Aberdeen IronBirds of the High-A East. In mid-August, he was promoted to the Bowie Baysox of the Double-A Northeast. Over 112 games between the three clubs, Westburg slashed .285/.389/.479 with 15 home runs, 79 RBIs, 17 stolen bases, and 27 doubles. He returned to Bowie to begin the 2022 season. After batting .247 with nine home runs and 32 RBIs over 47 games, he was promoted to the Norfolk Tides of the Triple-A International League in early June. Over 91 games with Norfolk to end the season, he batted .273 with 18 home runs and 74 RBIs.

References

External links

Mississippi State Bulldogs bio

1999 births
Living people
Baseball players from Texas
Sportspeople from New Braunfels, Texas
People from New Braunfels, Texas
Baseball shortstops
Mississippi State Bulldogs baseball players
United States national baseball team players
Hyannis Harbor Hawks players
Delmarva Shorebirds players
Aberdeen IronBirds players
Bowie Baysox players
Norfolk Tides players